Sandy Township may refer to:

 Sandy Township, St. Louis County, Minnesota
 Sandy Township, Stark County, Ohio
 Sandy Township, Tuscarawas County, Ohio
 Sandy Township, Clearfield County, Pennsylvania

Township name disambiguation pages